Acidiluteibacter is a Gram-negative genus of bacteria from the family of Cryomorphaceae with one known species (Acidiluteibacter ferrifornacis).

References

Sphingobacteriia
Bacteria genera
Monotypic bacteria genera
Taxa described in 2020